Euchrysops crawshayi, Crawshay's blue, is a butterfly in the family Lycaenidae. It is found in Kenya, Uganda, Tanzania, Burundi, Rwanda, Sudan and the Democratic Republic of the Congo. The habitat consists of moist savanna.

The larvae feed on Anchusa species, Cynoglossum coeruleum and Cynoglossum lanceolatum. They feed on the fleshy outer cortex of the main tap root of the host plant, always below ground. They are attended by many species of ants, including Monomorium minutum var. pallipes.

Subspecies
Euchrysops crawshayi crawshayi (Kenya, Uganda, Tanzania, southern Sudan)
Euchrysops crawshayi fontainei Stempffer, 1967 (Burundi, Rwanda, Democratic Republic of the Congo: east to South Kivu, north-western Tanzania)

References

Butterflies described in 1899
Euchrysops
Butterflies of Africa
Taxa named by Arthur Gardiner Butler